Shivana Jorawar is an American lawyer (Born 1986), reproductive justice advocate, and community organizer. She is of Asian-American Indo-Caribbean heritage.

Biography
Shivana Jorawar credits the tragedy of the September 11 attacks, together with the xenophobia that resulted from them with shaping her solidarity with the South Asian community and her decision to become an activist. In 2007, she co-founded Jahajee Sisters, an organization based in New York City to build empowerment for Indo-Caribbean women.

In 2011, she graduated from Emory University School of Law. She has worked as a legal clerk in the New York State Division of Human Rights, the American Civil Liberties Union of Georgia, and the Equal Employment Opportunity Commission. Jorawar worked for four years at the National Asian Pacific American Women’s Forum in Washington, D.C., leading that organizations's reproductive justice programming. She currently serves as the Federal Policy Director at the National Abortion Federation.

Jorawar has written numerous articles and lectured on the experiences of Asian-Americans/Pacific Islander Americans and the law, including articles on feticide prosecutions, abortion women's rights to control their own reproductive choices, She has been interviewed by mainstream media in an attempt to understand the issues which impact minority and immigrant women's lives.

She has studied Indian and Indo-Caribbean dance styles and written poetry that speaks to the trauma and resilience of women in her community.

References

1986 births
Living people
Lawyers from New York City
American women's rights activists
American social workers
American women lawyers
Fordham University alumni
Emory University School of Law alumni
Activists from New York City
21st-century American women